The Penrith Anglican College is an independent Anglican co-educational early learning, primary and secondary day school, located in Orchard Hills, near Penrith, New South Wales, Australia. The College is a member school of the Sydney Anglican Schools Corporation and caters for approximately 1,000 students from Pre-Kindergarten to Year 12.

History 
Penrith Anglican College was established by the Anglican Schools Corporation with a clear vision: to encourage students to live with purpose and to develop a personal faith in Christ. That founding vision remains at the heart of our College.

In 1994, John Lambert, the NSW Assistant Director-General of Education, recognised a need in the rapidly growing Penrith area, for a low fee, academically excellent Christian school and felt the Anglican Church could fill this gap.

In February 1994, Mr Lambert was appointed Director of Schools in the Sydney Anglican Schools Corporation. After much research, Mr Lambert purchased the land in Orchard Hills and construction began.

Mr Barry Roots was appointed Headmaster in 1997 and the Governors built a team of 12 staff to start the College in 1998.

In January 1998, Penrith Anglican College opened its doors to 137 students from Kindergarten to Year 7 and their families.

Today the College is attended by over 1000 students from Pre-Kindergarten to Year 12.

Mrs Felicity Grima became Principal of the College in 2019.

In 2018, the Acting Head Felicity Grima signed a petition with the Anglican Diocese of Sydney to retain s 38(3) in the Sex Discrimination Act 1984(Cth) which allows private religious schools “the right to employ staff who support the ethos of the school." the letter said.

“It is essential that a teacher supports the values, ethos and mission of the school as much as they can. It is not appropriate, for example, for a teacher to undermine or denigrate the beliefs and teaching of an employing school.”  In the petition it was argued that a more general right' to religious freedom should exist, and the existing exemptions, however, clumsy in the Sex Discrimination Act, should remain.

See also 

 List of Anglican schools in New South Wales
 Anglican education in Australia

References

1998 establishments in Australia
Anglican primary schools in Sydney
Educational institutions established in 1998
Anglican secondary schools in Sydney
City of Penrith
Anglican Diocese of Sydney